Lê Thị Phất Ngân (Chinese: 黎氏佛銀, 980s–after 1028), formally Empress Lập Giáo from 1016 to 1028 and Empress Dowager Linh Hiển afterward, was a princess of the Former Lê dynasty who became an empress of the Lý dynasty. Her father Lê Hoàn, half-brothers Đinh Phế Đế, Lê Trung Tông, Lê Long Đĩnh, husband Lý Thái Tổ and son Lý Thái Tông were all Đại Cồ Việt emperors.

Notes and references

980s births
11th-century deaths
11th-century Vietnamese women
10th-century Vietnamese women
Lý dynasty empresses
People from Ninh Bình province
Vietnamese princesses
Early Lê dynasty
Lý dynasty empresses dowager